Samodzielny Pododdział Antyterrorystyczny Policji (SPAP) are police tactical units of the Police of Poland operating under the supervision of the Chief Police Commander. The SPAP units operate under the voivodeship commands.

The comparable police unit on the national level is the BOA  .

History
The first special police units within the police of Poland were formed on 1 March 1978 as part of the paramilitary Motorized Reserves of the Citizens' Militia. In 1988, these units were increased to the size of companies. After the disbanding of the Polish Citizens' Militia and the creation of the modern Police Service, the special police units were named counter-terror companies. 

In 2000, the counter-terror companies were separated from the existing structures and became directly subordinate to the respective commander of the Voivodeships, along with the name change to Independent Counter-terrorism Police Subdivision.

Mission and Tasks
 High-risk arrests
 Counter-terrorism operations
 Assistance in police operations with divers
 Assistance in rescue operations
 Explosive Ordnance Disposal
 VIP protection
 Hostage rescue

Training
Due to the hazardous nature of their work, SPAP officers undergo a rigorous selection and training process.

Their training includes tactical training, advanced marksmanship and Combatives. Upon completion of their training, further specialization in various fields such as parachuting, altitude rescue, VIP-protection or IED-disposal is possible.

During their creation, their training was heavily influenced by American, English, French and Israeli police tactical units.

Organisation
SPAP units operate in each police voivodeship commands. They are located in Warsaw, Szczecin, Gdańsk, Białystok, Łódź, Poznań, Wrocław, Katowice, Kraków, and Rzeszów. In larger cities, SPKP units may consist of up to 55 officers each.
In smaller voivodship cities, SPAP units consist of approximately 20 policemen. These are located in: Kielce, Radom, Lublin, Gorzów Wielkopolski, Olsztyn, and Bydgoszcz. 

Depending on the size of the local police units, the SPAP officers operate in their respective units as part-time officers and are only called into their units when needed.

In 2017, the police of Poland underwent a process of reorganisation. The existence of BOA KGP as the national unit was maintained. However, the SPAPs units were reorganised and their structure, equipment and logistics were harmonised. 
The tasks of SPAPs were also specified in detail, adapting the order of the Chief Police Commander to the requirements of the Act on anti-terrorist activities.

SPAP has its own bomb-disposal section, in addition one of the sub-units is constantly on duty at the unit in case of operations.

References

Further reading
 Samodzielny Pododdział Kontrterrorystyczny Policji, Policia Podlaska, 2 February 2005, retrieved 1 July 2020.

External links
 Decyzja Nr 296 Komendanta Głównego Policji (Decision no. 296 of the main police commander), INFOR, 29 January 2000, the order creating the anti-terrorist units.

National law enforcement agencies of Poland
Police tactical units
ATLAS Network
Non-military counterterrorist organizations